A pentaquark is a human-made subatomic particle, consisting of four quarks and one antiquark bound together; they are not known to occur naturally, or exist outside of experiments specifically carried out to create them.

Further, because it has five quarks instead of the usual three found in regular baryons ( 'triquarks'), it is classified as an exotic baryon. The name pentaquark was coined by Claude Gignoux et al. (1987) and Harry J. Lipkin in 1987; however, the possibility of five-quark particles was identified as early as 1964 when Murray Gell-Mann first postulated the existence of quarks. Although predicted for decades, pentaquarks proved surprisingly difficult to discover and some physicists were beginning to suspect that an unknown law of nature prevented their production.

The first claim of pentaquark discovery was recorded at LEPS in Japan in 2003, and several experiments in the mid-2000s also reported discoveries of other pentaquark states. However, other researchers were not able to replicate the LEPS results, and the other pentaquark discoveries were not accepted because of poor data and statistical analysis. On 13 July 2015, the LHCb collaboration at CERN reported results consistent with pentaquark states in the decay of bottom Lambda baryons.
On 26 March 2019, the LHCb collaboration announced the discovery of a new pentaquark that had not been previously observed. On 5 July 2022, the LHCb collaboration announced the discovery of the  pentaquark.

Outside of particle research laboratories, pentaquarks might be produced naturally in the processes that result in the formation of neutron stars.

Background

A quark is a type of elementary particle that has mass, electric charge, and colour charge, as well as an additional property called flavour, which describes what type of quark it is (up, down, strange, charm, top, or bottom). Due to an effect known as colour confinement, quarks are never seen on their own. Instead, they form composite particles known as hadrons so that their colour charges cancel out. Hadrons made of one quark and one antiquark are known as mesons, while those made of three quarks are known as baryons. These 'regular' hadrons are well documented and characterized; however, there is nothing in theory to prevent quarks from forming 'exotic' hadrons such as tetraquarks with two quarks and two antiquarks, or pentaquarks with four quarks and one antiquark.

Structure

A wide variety of pentaquarks are possible, with different quark combinations producing different particles. To identify which quarks compose a given pentaquark, physicists use the notation qqqq, where q and  respectively refer to any of the six flavours of quarks and antiquarks. For instance a pentaquark made of two up quarks, one down quark, one charm quark, and one charm antiquark would be denoted uudc.

The quarks are bound together by the strong force, which acts in such a way as to cancel the colour charges within the particle. In a meson, this means a quark is partnered with an antiquark with an opposite colour charge – blue and antiblue, for example – while in a baryon, the three quarks have between them all three colour charges – red, blue, and green. In a pentaquark, the colours also need to cancel out, and the only feasible combination is to have one quark with one colour (e.g. red), one quark with a second colour (e.g. green), two quarks with the third colour (e.g. blue), and one antiquark to counteract the surplus colour (e.g. antiblue).

The binding mechanism for pentaquarks is not yet clear. They may consist of five quarks tightly bound together, but it is also possible that they are more loosely bound and consist of a three-quark baryon and a two-quark meson interacting relatively weakly with each other via pion exchange (the same force that binds atomic nuclei) in a "meson-baryon molecule".

History

Mid-2000s
The requirement to include an antiquark means that many classes of pentaquark are hard to identify experimentally – if the flavour of the antiquark matches the flavour of any other quark in the quintuplet, it will cancel out and the particle will resemble its three-quark hadron cousin. For this reason, early pentaquark searches looked for particles where the antiquark did not cancel. In the mid-2000s, several experiments claimed to reveal pentaquark states. This coincided with a pentaquark state with a mass of  predicted in 1997.
 
The proposed state was composed of two up quarks, two down quarks, and one strange antiquark (uudd). While concerns existed about the validity of these states, the Particle Data Group gave the  a 3-star rating (out of 4) in the 2004 Review of Particle Physics. Both were later found to be statistical effects rather than true resonances.

The 2006 Review of Particle Physics concluded:

The 2008 Review of Particle Physics went even further:

There are two or three recent experiments that find weak evidence for signals near the nominal masses, but there is simply no point in tabulating them in view of the overwhelming evidence that the claimed pentaquarks do not exist... The whole story—the discoveries themselves, the tidal wave of papers by theorists and phenomenologists that followed, and the eventual "undiscovery"—is a curious episode in the history of science.

However this 'discovery' was later revealed to be due to flawed methodology (https://www.osti.gov/biblio/21513283-critical-view-claimed-theta-sup-pentaquark).

2015 LHCb results

In July 2015, the LHCb collaboration at CERN identified pentaquarks in the  channel, which represents the decay of the bottom lambda baryon  into a J/ψ meson , a kaon  and a proton (p). The results showed that sometimes, instead of decaying via intermediate lambda states, the  decayed via intermediate pentaquark states. The analysis ruled out the possibility that the effect was caused by conventional particles.

The search for pentaquarks was not an objective of the LHCb experiment (which is primarily designed to investigate matter-antimatter asymmetry) and the apparent discovery of pentaquarks was described as an "accident" and "something we've stumbled across" by the Physics Coordinator for the experiment.

Studies of pentaquarks in other experiments

The production of pentaquarks from electroweak decays of  baryons has extremely small cross-section and yields very limited information about internal structure of pentaquarks. For this reason, there are several ongoing and proposed initiatives to study pentaquark production in other channels.

It is expected that pentaquarks will be studied in electron-proton collisions in hall B E2-16-007 and hall C E12-12-001A experiments at JLab. The major challenge in these studies is a heavy mass of the pentaquark, which will be produced at the tail of photon-proton spectrum in JLab kinematics. For this reason, the currently unknown branching fractions of pentaquark should be sufficiently large to allow pentaquark detection in JLab kinematics. The proposed Electron Ion Collider which has higher energies is much better suited for this problem.

An interesting channel to study pentaquarks in proton-nuclear collisions was suggested by Schmidt & Siddikov (2016). This process has a large cross-section due to lack of electroweak intermediaries and gives access to pentaquark wave function. In the fixed-target experiments pentaquarks will be produced with small rapidities in laboratory frame and will be easily detected.
Besides, if there are neutral pentaquarks, as suggested in several models based on flavour symmetry, these might be also produced in this mechanism. This process might be studied at future high-luminosity experiments like After@LHC and NICA.

2019 LHCb results
On 26 March 2019, the LHCb collaboration announced the discovery of a new pentaquark, based on observations that passed the 5-sigma threshold, using a dataset that was many times larger than the 2015 dataset.

Designated Pc(4312)+ (Pc+ identifies a charmonium-pentaquark while the number between parenthesis indicates a mass of about 4312 MeV), the pentaquark decays to a proton and a J/ψ meson. The analyses revealed additionally that the earlier reported observations of the Pc(4450)+ pentaquark actually were the average of two different resonances, designated Pc(4440)+ and Pc(4457)+. Understanding this will require further study.

Applications

The discovery of pentaquarks will allow physicists to study the strong force in greater detail and aid understanding of quantum chromodynamics. In addition, current theories suggest that some very large stars produce pentaquarks as they collapse. The study of pentaquarks might help shed light on the physics of neutron stars.

See also
 Baryon (triquark)
 Exotic matter
 Heptaquark
 Hexaquark
 List of particles
 Quark model
 Tetraquark

Explanatory footnotes

References

Further reading

External links

Baryons
Hadrons